Monoecy (adj. monoecious ) is a sexual system in seed plants where separate male and female cones or flowers are present on the same plant. It is a monomorphic sexual system alongside gynomonoecy, andromonoecy and trimonoecy.

Monoecy often co-occurs with anemophily. It can prevent self-pollination in an individual flower but cannot prevent self-pollination between male and female flowers on the same plant.

Monoecy in angiosperms has been of interest for evolutionary biologists since Charles Darwin.

Terminology 
Monoecious comes from the Greek words for one house.

History 
The term monoecy was first introduced in 1735 by Carl Linnaeus. Darwin noted that the flowers of monoecious species sometimes showed traces of the opposite sex function. Monoecious hemp was first reported in 1929.

Occurrence 
Monoecy is most common in temperate climates and is often associated with inefficient pollinators or wind-pollinated plants. It may be beneficial to reducing pollen-stigma interference, thus increasing seed production.

Around 10% of all seed plant species are monoecious. It is present in 7% of angiosperms. Most Cucurbitaceae are monoecious including most watermelon cultivars. It is prevalent in Euphorbiaceae. Dioecy is replaced by monoecy in the polyploid subspecies of Empetrum nigrum,  E. nigrum ssp. hermaphroditum and polyploid populations of Mercurialis annua.

Evolution 

The evolution of monoecy has received little attention. Male and female flowers evolve from hermaphroditic flowers via  andromonoecy or gynomonoecy.

In Amaranths monoecy may have evolved from hermaphroditism through various processes caused by male sterility genes and female fertility genes.

Monoecy has also been proposed to be an intermediate state between hermaphroditism and dioecy.

Evolution from dioecy to monoecy probably involves disruptive selection on floral sex ratios. Monoecy is also considered to be a step in the evolutionary pathway from hermaphroditism towards dioecy. Some authors even argue monoecy and dioecy are related. But, there is also evidence that monoecy is a pathway from sequential hermaphroditism to dioecy.

See also 

 Hermaphrodite
 Plant reproductive morphology

References 

Plant reproductive system
Sexual system